Worth County High School (also known as Worth County Comprehensive High School or Worth County College and Career Academy) is a public high school located in Sylvester, Georgia, United States. The school is part of the Worth County School District, which serves Worth County.

References

External links 
 Worth County School District website
 Worth County High School website

Schools in Worth County, Georgia
Public high schools in Georgia (U.S. state)